Carthage Township may refer to the following townships in the United States:

 Carthage Township, Hancock County, Illinois
 Carthage Township, Athens County, Ohio